is a Japanese pianist and composer who also uses the name Haruna Shibata. She was born in Tokyo and studied music there, making her debut as a pianist at age 14 playing Mozart with the Tokyo Symphony orchestra. She continued her studies at the Juilliard School of Music in New York City, and afterward worked as a pianist and composer, touring in the United States. She often collaborates with pianist and composer Yuji Takahashi. Her composition Poem for String Orchestra received the Edward Benjamin Award.

Works
Miyake combines Japanese and Western idiom, and often uses traditional Japanese instruments in her compositions. Selected works include:
Why Not, My Baby? for soprano, piano and trumpet
Shiyoku
Piano Concerto
Fantasy for Milky Way Railroad
Phantom of a Flower

References

1942 births
20th-century classical composers
20th-century classical pianists
20th-century Japanese composers
20th-century Japanese educators
20th-century Japanese women musicians
20th-century women composers
20th-century women educators
20th-century women pianists
21st-century classical composers
21st-century classical pianists
21st-century Japanese composers
21st-century Japanese educators
21st-century Japanese women musicians
21st-century women composers
21st-century women educators
21st-century women pianists
Concert band composers
Japanese classical composers
Japanese classical pianists
Japanese women classical composers
Japanese music educators
Japanese women pianists
Living people
Women classical pianists
Women music educators